DeSoto State Park is a public recreation area located on Lookout Mountain  northeast of Fort Payne, Alabama. It borders the Little River, which flows into the nearby Little River Canyon National Preserve.

History
The park, which bears the name of 16th-century explorer Hernando de Soto, was developed in the 1930s by the Civilian Conservation Corps. The park then known as State Park No. 5 was established in 1935. When it was dedicated as Desoto State Park on May 24, 1939, it was the largest state park in Alabama. The park's museum celebrating the CCC's work in Alabama state parks opened in 2013.

Awards 
In September 2020, DeSoto State Park was one of eleven Alabama state parks awarded Tripadvisor’s Traveler’s Choice Award, which recognizes businesses and attractions that earn consistently high user reviews.

Activities and amenities

References

External links
DeSoto State Park Alabama Department of Conservation and Natural Resources
DeSoto State Park Trail Map Alabama Department of Conservation and Natural Resources

Lookout Mountain
State parks of Alabama
State parks of the Appalachians
Protected areas of Cherokee County, Alabama
Civilian Conservation Corps in Alabama
Protected areas of DeKalb County, Alabama
National Recreation Trails in Alabama